"Go to Church" is the second official single from Ice Cube's album Laugh Now, Cry Later. The song features Snoop Dogg and Lil Jon. The song is also produced by Lil Jon and a music video was released for the song. In the edited version, instead of "mothafucka," Ice Cube says "mothamotha".

Music video
The music video features Lil Jon playing an electronic organ and Ice Cube and Snoop Dogg riding on lowrider bikes. It was directed by Marcus Raboy.  Some of the lyrics in the chorus, for example, "mothafucka," were blanked completely. Don "Magic" Juan, The Clipse, Bubba Sparxxx, WC, Ying Yang Twins, DJ Crazy Toones, Billie Joe Armstrong and Katt Williams made cameo appearances.
The music video first premiered on Making the Video one week after the release of the CD.

Chart positions

References

External links 
Guitar Tabs

2006 singles
Ice Cube songs
Music videos directed by Marcus Raboy
Snoop Dogg songs
Songs written by Snoop Dogg
Song recordings produced by Lil Jon
Songs written by Ice Cube
Songs written by Lil Jon
Gangsta rap songs
Lil Jon songs
2006 songs